Saccosporidae is a family of myxozoans. It is the only family within the class Malacosporea and has only three species, while the other class of Myxozoa, Myxosporea, includes more than a thousand.

Taxonomy and systematics
Genus Buddenbrockia Schröder, 1910
Buddenbrockia allmani Canning, Curry, Hill & Okamura, 2007
Buddenbrockia plumatellae Schröder, 1910
Genus Tetracapsuloides Canning, Tops, Curry, Wood & Okamura, 2002
Tetracapsuloides bryosalmonae (Canning, Curry, Feist, Longshaw & Okamura, 1999)

Description 
Saccosporidae are parasites of fish and freshwater bryozoans. Tetracapsuloides bryosalmonae, the only representative of the group whose life cycle is well studied, causes proliferative disease of the kidneys in salmonids. Two stages of the life cycles of the two species in the genus Buddenbrockia are known. One of them is a saccular stage, similar to Tetracapsuloides. During the second stage the animals are mobile and superficially resemble minute worms. Buddenbrockia allmani parasitizes Lophopus crystallinus, while Buddenbrockia plumatellae parasitizes, in particular, Plumatella fungosa.

References 

 

Malacosporea
Cnidarian families